Poots is a surname. Notable people with this name include:

Alex Poots (born 1967), British artistic director in New York City
Charles Poots (1929-2020), politician from Northern Ireland
Edwin Poots (born 1965), politician from Northern Ireland
Imogen Poots (born 1989), British actress
Tysson Poots (born 1988), American football player

See also
Poot (disambiguation)